Xylecata ugandicola is a moth of the  family Erebidae. It is found in the Democratic Republic of Congo and Uganda.

References

Nyctemerina
Moths described in 1909